The 2002 Middle Tennessee Blue Raiders football team represented Middle Tennessee State University as a member of the Sun Belt Conference during the 2002 NCAA Division I-A football season. Led by fourth-year head coach Andy McCollum, the Blue Raiders compiled an overall record of 4–8 with a mark of 2–4 in conference play, placing in a three-way tie for fourth place in the Sun Belt. Over the course of the season, the Middle Tennessee was outscored by its opponents by a total of 332 to 297.

Schedule

Game summaries

at Alabama

at No. 4 Tennessee

at Kentucky

Southeast Missouri State

at Arkansas State

at Vanderbilt

Louisiana–Lafayette

at Idaho

at New Mexico State

Louisiana–Monroe

North Texas

Utah State

References

Middle Tennessee
Middle Tennessee Blue Raiders football seasons
Middle Tennessee Blue Raiders football